Ryan Mills (born 30 May 1992) is an English professional rugby union player. He can play at both inside centre and at fly-half.

Mills previously played for Gloucester and Worcester Warriors in Premiership Rugby. He made his first appearance for Gloucester in the 2010/11 season coming off the bench in an away match to Saracens where he kicked a conversion in a 35-12 defeat. His most memorable moment for Gloucester came in an away match to rivals Bath the following season where he successfully kicked a late penalty to gain a 14-11 win.

On 28 January 2014 it was announced that Mills would be moving to Worcester Warriors for the 2014-15 season.

In May 2017 he was invited to a training camp with the senior England squad by Eddie Jones.

On 4 March 2020, it was announced that Mills have signed for Premiership rivals Wasps from the 2020-21 season. He was made redundant along with every other Wasps player and coach when the team entered administration on 17 October 2022.

On 11 November 2022, Mills signed for Premiership rivals Sale Sharks for the rest of the 2022-23 season.

References

External links
Gloucester profile
https://rugby.statbunker.com/players/getPlayerStats?player_id=29832

1992 births
Living people
English rugby union players
Gloucester Rugby players
Rugby union players from Exeter
Worcester Warriors players
Rugby union centres